The following lists events that happened during 2015 in the Tunisian Republic.

Events

February
 5 February - A unity government is approved by the parliament and is formed by members of the secular Nidaa Tounes, two liberal parties and a moderate Islamist party.
 17 February - 20 Islamist militants attack a checkpoint at the Kasserine Governorate, killing 4 police officers and stealing their weapons.

March
 18 March - Gunmen attack the Bardo National Museum, adjacent to the parliament building in Tunis, killing at least 19 people.

May
 25 May - A Tunisian soldier kills 7 of his fellow soldiers and injures 10 others in a shooting rampage in Tunis before killing himself.

June
 26 June - 2015 Ramadan attacks
 Two hotels are attacked in Sousse by unknown gunmen, killing 38 people and injuring 36. This was on the same day as attacks in France, Kuwait, Syria and Somalia.
 27 June - 2015 Sousse attacks
 The Tunisian government plans to close down 80 "propagandist" mosques following the previous attack yesterday.
 Nineteen of the victims are revealed to be from other countries; fifteen from the United Kingdom and one each from Belgium, Portugal, Germany and Ireland.
 28 June - 2015 Sousse attacks
 1000 Tunisian police officers are deployed on beaches and resorts to increase defence following the attack two days ago.
 The number of British victims killed in the attack is expected to go up to 30 so the UK government warns its citizens about going to Tunisia.

July
 4 July - 2015 Sousse attacks
 President Beji Caid Essebsi declares a state of emergency.

References 

 
Years of the 21st century in Tunisia
Tunisia
Tunisia
2010s in Tunisia